Nassarius consensus, common name the striate nassa, is a species of sea snail, a marine gastropod mollusk in the family Nassariidae, the Nassa mud snails or dog whelks.

Description
The length of the shell varies between 8 mm and 15 mm.

Distribution
This species occurs in the Gulf of Mexico, the Caribbean Sea and the Lesser Antilles; in the Atlantic Ocean off North Carolina and South Carolina, USA.

References

 Mansfield, W. C. 1930. Miocene gastropods and scaphopods of the Choctawhatchee Formation of Florida. Florida State Geological Survey Bulletin 3: 189 pp., 21 pls.
 Olsson, A. A. and A. Harbison. 1953. Pliocene Mollusca of Southern Florida, with special reference to those from North Saint Petersburg. Monographs of the Academy of Natural Sciences of Philadelphia 8: vii + 459, 65 pls.
 Cernohorsky W. O. (1984). Systematics of the family Nassariidae (Mollusca: Gastropoda). Bulletin of the Auckland Institute and Museum 14: 1–356.
 Rosenberg, G., F. Moretzsohn, and E. F. García. 2009. Gastropoda (Mollusca) of the Gulf of Mexico, Pp. 579–699 in Felder, D.L. and D.K. Camp (eds.), Gulf of Mexico–Origins, Waters, and Biota. Biodiversity. Texas A&M Press, College Station, Texas.

External links
 

Nassariidae
Gastropods described in 1861